George Trenchard (c. 1684–1758), of Lytchett Matravers, near Poole, Dorset, was a British landowner and  Whig politician who sat in the House of Commons for 35 years between 1713 and 1754.

Trenchard was the eldest son of Sir John Trenchard and his wife Philippa Speke, daughter of George Speke of White Lackington, Somerset. He joined the army and was an ensign in the  Earl of Monmouth's Foot in 1693. In 1695 he succeeded to the estates of his father and  joined Colonel Henry Mordaunt's  Foot. He left the army by 1702 when he was admitted at Middle Temple on 21 April 1702. He was admitted  at Jesus College, Cambridge on 12 May 1705. He married his cousin Mary Trenchard (died 1740), daughter of Thomas Trenchard, She was the heiress of Wolveton, Dorset, which, combined with the property he had inherited from his father, made Trenchard a substantial landowner in Dorset
 
By 1712 Trenchard had become a friend of Thomas Burnet, a Whig pamphleteer, and stood bail for Burnet when he was prosecuted in 1713 for publishing the anti-ministerial pamphlet A Certain Information of a Certain Discourse. Trenchard was returned as Member of Parliament for Poole on his own interest at the  1713 British general election. He voted against the expulsion of Richard Steele on 18 March 1714, and was classed as a Whig.

Trenchard was returned again as Whig MP  for Poole at the  1715 British general election. Thereafter, he voted consistently with the Administration except on the Peerage Bill in 1719.  He was appointed vice.-admiral of  Poole and Dorset in 1716. His only known speech was, in the committee on the South Sea sufferers bill, on 2 June 1721, when he moved that Sir Theodore Janssen be allowed to keep £50,000 from his estate. He was returned again for Poole in 1722,  1727 and 1734. At the  1741 British general election  he chose to  stand with Thomas Wyndham, but it turned out that the Corporation were not prepared to support them, and he did not proceed to the poll.  He was returned again unopposed at the  1747 British general election with a different running mate..  Before the 1754 British general election  he gave his interest at Poole to Sir Richard Lyttelton, on condition that his son John Trenchard should be made a commissioner of taxes.

Trenchard died on  31 March 1758.  Of his six sons and five daughter, three each predeceased him.

References

1680s births
1758 deaths
Members of the Parliament of Great Britain for English constituencies
British MPs 1713–1715
British MPs 1715–1722
British MPs 1722–1727
British MPs 1727–1734
British MPs 1734–1741
British MPs 1747–1754